TCG Turgutreis (F 241) is a  of the Turkish Navy.

Development and design 

Yavuz-class frigates were designed in Germany and are part of the MEKO family of modular warships; in this case the MEKO 200 design. An order for ships was signed by the Turkish government in April 1983 for four MEKO frigates. Two ships were built in Germany and two in Turkey with German assistance. They are similar in design to the larger s of the Turkish Navy, which are improved versions of the Yavuz-class frigate.

The Turkish Navy has an ongoing limited modernization project for an Electronic Warfare Suite. The intent is to upgrade the ships with locally produced the ECM, ECCM systems, active decoys, LWRs, IRST and the necessary user interface systems.

Construction and career 
Turgutreis was launched on 30 May 1986 by Howaldtswerke-Deutsche Werft in Kiel and commissioned on 4 February 1988.

On 10 March 2021, TCG Turgutreis and TCG Oruçreis operated alongside  and VP-46 in the Black Sea.

References

External links

 The First Upgraded MEKO 200 Frigate Of Turkish Navy
 BARBAROS CLASS ( MEKO 200 Track II) (Turkey)

1986 ships
Ships built in Germany
Yavuz-class frigates